Mona Tougaard (born 3 April 2002) is a Danish fashion model.

Early life 
Tougaard was born in Aarhus, Denmark, and is of Somali and Turkish descent. She has two older siblings. Her mother passed away when she was 9. She was scouted at age 12, and won the Elite Model Look Denmark contest when she was 15. She was a finalist in the global competition.

Career 

Tougaard debuted as a Prada exclusive in 2019. Between two seasons she opened for Loewe and Fendi, also walking for Chanel, Louis Vuitton, Stella McCartney, Valentino, Miu Miu, Versace, Burberry, Dior, Victoria Beckham, Max Mara, Lanvin (which she closed), Salvatore Ferragamo, Alberta Ferretti, Givenchy, Dries Van Noten, Paco Rabanne, Chloé, and Saint Laurent among 40 shows.

She has appeared in advertisements for Prada, Louis Vuitton, Loewe, Chanel, Max Mara, Chloé and Ports 1961. She appeared on the cover of i-D'''s Post Truth Truth issue with contributions by American model Adesuwa Aighewi.

For the F/W 2019 season, models.com deemed her a "top newcomer", with Vogue noticing, she "swept Paris Fashion Week, landing nearly all the city's key shows". She also ranked as the "Breakout Star" in models.com's "Model of the Year" Awards. Currently, she is one of the "Top 50" models on models.com.

She appeared on a cover for British Vogue's April 2021 issue. Both she and Somali-American model Ugbad Abdi appear on the August 2022 cover of Vogue France''.

References 

Living people
2002 births
Danish female models
People from Aarhus
Prada exclusive models
Danish people of Ethiopian descent
Danish people of Somali descent
Danish people of Turkish descent
LGBT models